Menu engineering or Menu psychology, is the design of a menu to maximize restaurant profits.

Visual perception 
Visual perception and attention are linked to how customers read a menu. Most menus are presented visually (though many restaurants verbally list daily specials), and the majority of menu engineering recommendations focus on how to increase attention by strategically arranging menu categories within the pages of the menu, and item placement within a menu category. This strategic placement of categories and items is referred to as the theory of sweet spots.

The reasoning being sweet spots stem from the classical effect in psychology known as the serial position effect (also known as the rules of recency and primacy). The thought is, customers are most likely to remember the first and last things they see on a menu—hence, sweet spots on a menu should be where the customers look first and last. To date, there is no empirical evidence on the efficacy of the sweet spots on menus.

Customer perception of items offered on a menu can also be affected by subtle textual manipulations. For example, descriptive labeling of menu items may produce positive effects, leading to higher customer satisfaction, and higher perceived product value. Similarly, the presence of dollar signs or other potential monetary cues may cause guests to spend less.

Managerial accounting 
Low food cost and high gross profit are not mutually exclusive attributes of a menu item. A second approach called cost-margin analysis identifies items that are both low in food cost and return a higher than average gross profit. These items referred to as primes.

Further reading 
 
 
 
 
 
 
 Balthazar menu

References 

Restaurant menus
Product management